Ramović is a Bosnian surname. Notable people with the surname include:

Demir Ramović (born 1982), retired Montenegrin footballer
Džejla Ramović (born 2002), Bosnian singer, winner of Zvezde Granda
Sead Ramović (born 1979), retired Bosnian footballer
Sinan Ramović (born 1992), Bosnian footballer

Bosnian surnames
Slavic-language surnames